Puerto Rico Highway 518 (PR-518) is a rural road located entirely in the municipality of Adjuntas, Puerto Rico.

Major intersections

See also

 List of highways numbered 518

References

518
Adjuntas, Puerto Rico